Džeko is a Bosnian surname. Notable people with the surname include:

 Edin Džeko (born 1986), Bosnian footballer
 Jasmin Džeko (born 1958), Bosnian footballer
 Dzeko (DJ) (born 1992), Canadian music producer, member of Dzeko & Torres
 Šaćir Džeko (born 1956), Yugoslav sports shooter

Bosnian surnames